Mark Traecey Patrick Kimmitt  (born 21 June 1954) is the former Assistant Secretary of State for Political-Military Affairs, serving under George W. Bush from August 2008 to January 2009; he was the 16th person to hold the post.  Prior to joining the State Department, he was a brigadier general in the United States Army, and served as the Deputy Assistant Secretary of Defense for Middle East.  Kimmitt has also served as deputy director for strategy and plans for the United States Central Command, and deputy director for operations/chief military spokesman for coalition forces in Iraq, and served at NATO's SHAPE headquarters in Belgium.

Early life and education
Kimmitt was born in Fort Sill, Oklahoma, while his father was stationed there. His older brother Robert also served in the U.S. Army and was the former United States Ambassador to Germany. Their father, Joseph Stanley Kimmitt, was the Secretary of the United States Senate and Secretary for the Majority from 1977 to 1981.

Kimmitt graduated from the United States Military Academy at West Point as a part of the class of 1976, and earned a Masters in Business Administration degree from Harvard University as part of the class of 1984. He also received master's degrees from the United States Army Command and General Staff College and the National Defense University. He earned a certification as a Chartered Financial Analyst (CFA) while serving as assistant professor of finance and economics in the Department of Social Sciences at the United States Military Academy.

Personal life
He is married to Catherine Kimmitt.

Military career
Kimmitt retired from the US Army a brigadier general in December 2006.  While in the Army, Kimmitt had command and staff assignments throughout the United States, Europe, Asia and the Middle East, including planning positions within both Allied and Joint service commands. Additionally, he spent three years as an assistant professor and instructor with the Military Academy's Department of Social Sciences.

Kimmitt's professional military education includes the Field Artillery Officer Basic and Armor Officer Advanced Courses, the Army Command and General Staff College, the Advanced Military Studies Program, and the National War College.
Additionally, Kimmitt completed Ranger, Airborne, Jumpmaster, Naval Gunfire, Joint Firepower Control, Air Assault, Pathfinder, and Jungle Schools.

Timeline
Kimmitt's military service:

1977–78 – Battery executive officer; 1/15th Field Artillery; Camp Stanley, Korea
1978–80 – Fire support officer; 2nd Ranger Battalion; Fort Lewis, Washington
1980–82 – Battery commander and battery executive officer; 9th Infantry Division; Fort Lewis, Washington
1984–87 – Assistant professor, Department of Social Sciences; U.S. Military Academy; West Point, NY
1989–91 – Chief of war plans; 8th Infantry Division; Bad Kreuznach, Germany
1991–92 – 4/29th Field Artillery; Baumholder, Germany
1992–93 – Division artillery executive officer; 1st Armored Division; Baumholder, Germany
1993–96 – Battalion commander; 2/320th Field Artillery; Fort Campbell, KY
1996–97 – Special assistant – J5; Joint Chiefs of Staff; The Pentagon
1997–00 – Division artillery commander; 1st Armored Division; Baumholder, Germany
2000–02 – Military assistant to the Supreme Allied Commander Europe; Supreme Headquarters, Allied Powers Europe; Mons, Belgium
2002–04 – Chief of staff and commander; Corps Artillery XVIII Airborne Corps; Fort Bragg, NC
2003–04 – Deputy director of operations; Combined Joint Task Force – Seven; Baghdad, Iraq
2004–06 – Deputy director, strategy, plans and policy; U.S. Central Command; MacDill Air Force Base, FL

Awards and decorations
Kimmitt's distinctive awards and decorations include the following:

United States awards
  Defense Superior Service Medal
  Legion of Merit
  Bronze Star
  Defense Meritorious Service Medal
  Meritorious Service Medal
  Army Commendation Medal
  Joint Service Commendation Medal
  Korean Defense Service Medal
  Global War on Terrorism Expeditionary Medal
  Global War on Terror Service Medal
  Armed Forces Expeditionary Medal
  Master Parachutist Wings

Foreign and international awards
  NATO Medal for operations in Bosnia
  NATO Medal for operations in Kosovo
  NATO Medal for operations in Republic of Macedonia.
  NATO Meritorious Service Medal
German Parachutist Wings
German Leistungsabzeichen in Gold.

Government career

Subsequent to retiring from the Army in 2006, Kimmitt served as the Deputy Assistant Secretary of Defense for Middle East Policy, responsible for military policy development, planning, guidance and oversight for the region.  Kimmitt served in this position until July 31, 2008, before being nominated as Assistant Secretary of State.  Kimmitt's nomination was delayed because of two investigations into anonymous letters sent to the Senate Foreign Relations Committee, but was ultimately confirmed, and was sworn as Assistant Secretary of State on August 8, 2008.  In this role, Kimmitt was responsible for State Department political-military policy, with particular emphasis on security assistance and sales of arms around the world, as well as serving as the primary liaison between the Departments of State and Defense. He was also instrumental in recent counter-piracy operations off the coast of Somalia, and negotiated the groundbreaking arrangements for the prosecution of pirates abroad.  He left office in January 2009.

Nomination delay

Kimmitt's nomination for Assistant Secretary of State was delayed because of two investigations into anonymous letters sent to the Senate Foreign Relations Committee. Upon receipt of each letter, Sen. Joseph Biden requested that the Inspector General of the Department of Defense (IG) investigate the allegations. After a four-month investigation, the IG concluded after the first investigation that "BG Kimmitt's leadership style was occasionally inconsistent with the standards expected for senior Government leaders" and that "cognizant management officials should continue to monitor his leadership style." "[T]estimony indicated that morale In BG Kimmitt's organization was negatively affected by BG Kimmitt's leadership style, combined with the heavy workload and long hours. Finally, we found that BG Kimmitt's leadership style discouraged subordinates from free and open communication with him." The report also stated that the IG "obtained testimonial evidence that tended to mitigate the adverse impact of BG Kimmitt's leadership lapses. In that regard several witnesses, primarily BG Kimmitt's superiors, emphasized that BG Kimmitt brings superb qualifications and intellect to his position; that he has strengthened the overall performance of his office; and that he operates in a stressful, demanding environment, which could trigger confrontation." The Department of Defense Inspector General's office, in a separate letter to the committee, also disclosed "a substantiated allegation that Mr. Kimmitt ... failed to properly safeguard information, in violation of Army regulations," but it did not elaborate. The exact nature of this violation has not been disclosed.

Controversy
In the aftermath of the Mukaradeeb wedding party massacre, Kimmitt claimed, "There was no evidence of a wedding: no decorations, no musical instruments found, no large quantities of food or leftover servings one would expect from a wedding celebration. There may have been some kind of celebration. Bad people have celebrations, too." However video footage obtained by the Associated Press seems to contradict this view. The video shows a series of scenes of a wedding celebration, and footage from the following day showing fragments of musical instruments, pots and pans and brightly colored beddings used for celebrations, scattered around a destroyed tent.

References

External links
 Mark Kimmitt State Department biography
 

United States Military Academy alumni
United States Army generals
Harvard Business School alumni
Living people
1954 births
Political-Military Affairs
Recipients of the Legion of Merit
Recipients of the Defense Superior Service Medal
CFA charterholders